Darreh Piri (also Romanized as Darreh Pīrī) is a village in Zalian Rural District, Zalian District, Shazand County, Markazi Province, Iran. At the 2006 census, its population was 71, in 26 families.

References 

Populated places in Shazand County